Navicula my is a species of algae in the genus Navicula.

References

Further reading
 

my
Species described in 1895